"It Isn't, It Wasn't, It Ain't Never Gonna Be" is a duet recorded between Aretha Franklin and Whitney Houston, and appeared on Franklin's 1989 album Through the Storm. The song was released on June 10, 1989, as the second single from the album by Arista Records.

The original album version was written by Albert Hammond and Diane Warren and produced by Narada Michael Walden, and the re-mixed version was produced by Teddy Riley. In the US, the single reached No. 41 on the Billboard Hot 100 and No. 5 on the R&B Singles chart. On the UK Singles Chart, it peaked at No. 29.

Critical reception 
AllMusic editor William Ruhlmann retrospectively panned "It Isn't, It Wasn't, It Ain't Never Gonna Be," calling it, "an embarrassing failure for both Franklin and the previously pop-perfect Whitney Houston."

Track listings 
Album Version - 5:37
Single Edit - 4:49
Single Remix/Teddy Riley Mix - 4:02
Extended Remix - 6:12
Hip Hop Remix - 4:57
House Radio Mix - 5:05
New Jack Swing Dub Mix - 6:20
After Hours Club Mix - 7:35
1989 Vogue Dub Mix

Personnel
 Aretha Franklin – lead vocals, vocal engineer
 Whitney Houston – lead vocals
 Walter "Baby Love" Afanasieff – co-producer, keyboards, synth bass, drum programming
 Narada Michael Walden – producer, arrangements
 Ren Klyce – Fairlight CMI programming
 Karen "Kitty Beethoven" Brewington, Melisa Kary – backing vocals
 Lincoln Clapp – engineer
 David Frazer – engineer, mixing engineer
 Dana Jon Chappelle - additional engineer

Charts

Weekly charts

Year-end charts

References 

1989 singles
1989 songs
Whitney Houston songs
Aretha Franklin songs
Song recordings produced by Narada Michael Walden
Song recordings produced by Teddy Riley
Songs written by Diane Warren
Songs written by Albert Hammond
Arista Records singles
Female vocal duets
New jack swing songs